The 2001–02 Real Betis season was Real Betis's first season back in top-division of the Spanish football league, the La Liga, and the 94th as a football club. Besides the La Liga, the club also competed in the 2001–02 Copa del Rey, losing in the round of 64 to Segunda División B side AD Ceuta.

Competitions

Overview

La Liga

League table

Results summary

Results by round

Matches

Copa del Rey

References 

Real Betis seasons
Real Betis